The Avanti-Magadhan wars were fought between the ancient Indian empires of Magadha and  Avanti for domination over much of North India.

The ancient Indian states were almost always in conflict with one another. During the reign of Bimbisara of the Haryanka dynasty,Magadha pursued an expansionist policy. This caused him to come into conflict with Pradyota, the ruler of Avanti. Bimbisara had to fortify Rajgir due to the threat of an Avanti invasion. During the early years of the reign of Ajatashatru, Avanti managed to establish its supremacy by invading certain parts of Magadhan territories.

Shishunaga: Conquest of Avanti 
After the death of Ajatashatru a period of uncertainty followed and a succession of weak rulers again gave rise to a threat of a Pradyota invasion. Enraged by this, the people of Magadha overthrew the last of the Haryanka rulers and one of the ministers, Shishunaga, usurped the throne. Shishunaga defeated the Pradyota dynasty of Avanti, removing a major threat to the Magadhan Empire.

See also 
Magadha-Vajji war

References 

History of India
 Magadha
 Avanti (India)
 Rajgir
5th century BC in India
5th-century BC conflicts
Wars involving ancient India